Raymond Kaelbel (31 January 1932 – 17 April 2007) was a French international footballer who was part of France national football team during 1958 FIFA World Cup.

He was the member of The Board of directors of RC Strasbourg and resided in Illkirch-Graffenstaden before his death.

Honours
Monaco
Division 1: 1960–61
Coupe de France: 1959–60

Strasbourg
Coupe de France: 1965–66

External links
Profile on French federation official site
Profile
(International caps)
Profile
Obituary at UEFA.com

1932 births
2007 deaths
Sportspeople from Colmar
French people of German descent
French footballers
French expatriate sportspeople in Monaco
France international footballers
Association football defenders
RC Strasbourg Alsace players
AS Monaco FC players
Le Havre AC players
Stade de Reims players
Ligue 1 players
1954 FIFA World Cup players
ASPV Strasbourg managers
1958 FIFA World Cup players
French football managers
Expatriate footballers in Monaco
Footballers from Alsace